The Rangers' Round-Up is a 1938 American Western film directed by Sam Newfield and written by George H. Plympton. The film stars Fred Scott, Al St. John, Christine McIntyre, Earle Hodgins, Steve Ryan and Karl Hackett. The film was released on February 9, 1938, by Spectrum Pictures.

Plot

Cast           
Fred Scott as Tex Duncan
Al St. John as Fuzzy
Christine McIntyre as Mary
Earle Hodgins as Doc Aikman 
Steve Ryan as Bull Bailey
Karl Hackett as Hank 
Robert Owen as Al
Sydney Chatton as Jim
Carl Mathews as Dirk
Richard Cramer as Burton
Jimmy Aubrey as The Drunk
Lew Porter as Piano Player
Cactus Mack as Guitar Player

References

External links
 

1938 films
1930s English-language films
American Western (genre) films
1938 Western (genre) films
Films directed by Sam Newfield
American black-and-white films
Films with screenplays by George H. Plympton
1930s American films